St John's Church is a defunct Grade II listed church in the village of Dowlais, near Merthyr Tydfil in Wales.

The church was built in 1827 for local ironworks manager Sir John Josiah Guest, at a cost of £3000. It was gradually completely rebuilt later in the century, in a Gothic style, finishing with the main nave and aisle in 1893/4. Sir John (d. 1852) was buried in an iron coffin in the chancel under a red granite slab.

The church finally closed in 1997 and, in early 2015, was put up for sale with an asking price of £50,000. It was subsequently earmarked for £400,000 of Welsh Government grants to support its repair and redevelopment.

References

Churches completed in 1894
Dowlais
Dowlais, St John
Dowlais, St John
Religious organizations established in 1827
Religious organizations disestablished in 1997